Ladislav Ondřej (born 26 August 1912, date of death unknown) was a Czech sports shooter. He competed in the 25 m pistol event at the 1952 Summer Olympics.

References

External links
 

1912 births
Year of death missing
Czech male sport shooters
Olympic shooters of Czechoslovakia
Shooters at the 1952 Summer Olympics
Place of birth missing